Rob Whitehurst (born November 14, 1951) is a retired American Production Sound Mixer and Audio Engineer.

Born in Tampa, Florida, Whitehurst was a prominent sound mixer in the film and television industry.

Since 1990 he has worked on television shows such as American Idol, Extreme Makeover: Home Edition, The Biggest Loser, Dr. Phil, COPS, 60 Minutes, The Tonight Show with Jay Leno, Hard Knocks and Full Contact (NFL Films productions) and numerous movies and documentaries including the Christian independent films Facing the giants, Fireproof, Letters to God, The Glass Window and Courageous.

Filmography

Sound Mixer - Television
 20/20 (ABC News)
 20th Century with Mike Wallace (CBS News)
 48 Hours (CBS News)
 60 Minutes (CBS News)
 999 (BBC)
 A Current Affair
 ABC's Wide World of Sports (ABC Sports)
 American Idol (FOX)
 American Masters (PBS)
 America's Most Wanted (FOX)
 Apprentice, The: Martha Stewart (NBC)
 Arrest & Trial (USA)
 Best Damn Sports Show Period, The (FOX Sports)
 Biggest Loser, The (NBC)
 Body of Evidence (truTV)
 Bonkers (Disney)
 CBS Evening News (CBS News)
 Comedy Central Presents (Comedy Central)
 COPS (FOX/Spike)
 Dateline NBC (NBC News)
 Day Of The Shark (Discovery)
 Dr. Phil (CBS)
 Entertainment Tonight
 Extra (NBC)
 Extreme Makeover (ABC)
 Extreme Makeover: Home Edition (ABC)
 Forensic Files (Court TV)
 FOX News (FOX News)
 FOX NFL Sunday (FOX)
 Frontline (PBS)
 Ghost Stories (Travel Channel)
 Glenn Miller: America's Musical Hero (PBS)
 Good Morning America (ABC News)
 Hard Copy (CBS)
 Hard Knocks (HBO)
 I, Detective (Court TV)
 Inside Edition
 Inside the NFL (HBO Sports)
 Jack Hanna's Animal Adventures
 Jeff Corwin Unleashed (Discovery)
 LIVE! with Regis and Kathie Lee (ABC)
 Medical Detectives (TLC)
 MSNBC Live (MSNBC)
 MTV Rock 'N' Jock Basketball VI (MTV)
 MTV Sports (MTV)
 National Geographic Explorer (TBS)
 Nature (PBS)
 NBC Nightly News (NBC News)
 New Detectives, The (Discovery)
 News On CNBC, The (CNBC)
 NFL Full Contact (truTV)
 NFL Presents (NFL Network)
 Nova (PBS)
 Oprah Winfrey Show, The
 Real Sports with Bryant Gumbel (HBO Sports)
 Scientific American Frontiers with Alan Alda (PBS)
 Sunday Morning (CBS News)
 Super Bowl XXXV (CBS)
 Super Bowl XLIII (Disney MVP)
 This Week In Baseball (FOX Sports)
 Today Show, The (NBC)
 Tonight Show with Jay Leno (NBC)
 Under The Helmet (FOX Sports)
 World News Tonight (ABC News)

References

External links
Rob Whitehurst Official Site
 

1951 births
American audio engineers
American performers of Christian music
Living people
Musicians from Tampa, Florida
People from Tampa, Florida
Guitarists from Florida
20th-century American bass guitarists